Haim Jelin (born 12 August 1958, Haim Yellin) is an Israeli politician. He served as a member of the Knesset for Yesh Atid from 2015 to 2019, having previously been head of Eshkol Regional Council from 2007 to 2015.

Biography

Jelin was born in Buenos Aires, Argentina, and immigrated to Israel at age 18. He served in the Israel Defense Forces as a lone soldier, instructing tank commanders. He studied economics and management at Sapir Academic College and Ben-Gurion University. Jelin is a member of kibbutz Be'eri.
 
Jelin is married to Ziva, an artist, art teacher, and curator of the gallery in Be'eri. They have four children.

Political career
Jelin was elected head of the Eshkol Regional Council in 2007. The area, which borders the Gaza Strip, was heavily attacked by rockets during the 2014 Israel-Gaza conflict. Jelin expressed his skepticism and frustration at the government's plans for cease-fire during this time. He was placed seventh on the Yesh Atid list for the 2015 Knesset elections, and was elected to the Knesset when the party won 11 seats. After being elected, he had to give up his Argentine citizenship. He defected to the Labor Party in the build-up to the April 2019 elections and was placed tenth on its list. However, Labor won only six seats.

References

External links

Living people
1958 births
Argentine Jews
Israeli Jews
Israeli people of Argentine-Jewish descent
Argentine emigrants to Israel
People from Buenos Aires
Sapir Academic College alumni
Ben-Gurion University of the Negev alumni
Yesh Atid politicians
Kibbutzniks
Mayors of places in Israel
Members of the 20th Knesset (2015–2019)